Lucia Autorino Salemme (1919-2010) was an American artist. Her work is included in the collections of the Whitney Museum of American Art and the Metropolitan Museum of Art.

References

1919 births
2010 deaths
American women artists
21st-century American women